Ambatonikonilahy is a town and commune in Madagascar. It belongs to the district of Betafo, which is a part of Vakinankaratra Region. The population of the commune was estimated to be approximately 18,000 in 2001 commune census.

Only primary schooling is available. The majority 85% of the population of the commune are farmers, while an additional 15% receives their livelihood from raising livestock. The most important crops are potatoes and fruits, while other important agricultural products are vegetables, maize and sweet potatoes.

References and notes 

Populated places in Vakinankaratra